Herbert Rogers (17 April 1906 – 19 January 1976) was a Barbadian cricketer. He played in three first-class matches for the Barbados cricket team from 1926 to 1929.

See also
 List of Barbadian representative cricketers

References

External links
 

1906 births
1976 deaths
Barbadian cricketers
Barbados cricketers
People from Saint Michael, Barbados